Kuretno is a settlement in the Municipality of Laško in eastern Slovenia. The area is part of the traditional region of Styria. It is now included with the rest of the municipality in the Savinja Statistical Region.

The local church is dedicated to Saint Catherine and belongs to the Parish of Laško. It dates to the 15th century.

References

External links
Kuretno on Geopedia

Populated places in the Municipality of Laško